Persicaria is a genus of herbaceous flowering plants in the knotweed family, Polygonaceae. Plants of the genus are known commonly as knotweeds or smartweeds. It has a cosmopolitan distribution, with species occurring nearly worldwide. The genus was segregated from Polygonum.

Description
The genus includes annual and perennial herbs with taproots or fibrous root systems, or with rhizomes or stolons. The stems are often erect but may be prostrate along the ground, and some species are prickly. The stems are self-supporting or twining and climbing. The leaves are alternately arranged, deciduous, and variously shaped. The brownish or reddish ochrea may be leathery to papery. The inflorescence may be a panicle or a spikelike or headlike arrangement of fascicles of flowers. The flower is white, greenish, reddish, pink or purple, with the tepals partially fused together along the bases. The fruit is an achene which can take a number of shapes, including a disc or a sphere.

Taxonomy
Within the family Polygonaceae, Persicaria is placed in the subfamily Polygonoideae, where the tribe Persicarieae consists of two sister genera, Bistorta and Koenigia, together with  Persicaria.

Species
, Plants of the World Online accepted the following 131 species:

Persicaria acuminata (Kunth) M.Gómez
Persicaria akakiensis (Cufod.) Soják
Persicaria amphibia (L.) Delarbre – amphibious bistort, water smartweed
Persicaria angustifolia (Pall.) Ronse Decr.
Persicaria arifolia (L.) Haraldson – halberd-leaf tearthumb
Persicaria assamica (Meisn.) Soják
Persicaria attenuata (R.Br.) Soják
Persicaria barbata (L.) H.Hara
Persicaria biconvexa (Hayata) Nemoto
Persicaria bicornis (Raf.) Nieuwl. – pink smartweed
Persicaria breviochreata (Makino) Ohki
Persicaria bungeana (Turcz.) Nakai – prickly smartweed
Persicaria capitata (Buch.-Ham. ex D.Don) H.Gross – pink-head knotweed
Persicaria careyi (Olney) Greene – Carey's smartweed
Persicaria cespitosa (Blume) Nakai
Persicaria chinensis (L.) H.Gross – Chinese knotweed
Persicaria debilis (Meisn.) H.Gross ex W.Lee
Persicaria decipiens (R.Br.) K.L.Wilson – slender knotweed, willow-weed
Persicaria dichotoma (Blume) Masam.
Persicaria dissitiflora (Hemsl.) H.Gross ex T.Mori
Persicaria eciliata M.A.Hassan
Persicaria extremiorientalis (Vorosch.) Tzvelev
Persicaria ferruginea (Wedd.) Soják
Persicaria filiformis (Thunb.) Nakai
Persicaria foliosa (H.Lindb.) Kitag.
Persicaria galapagensis (Caruel) Galasso
Persicaria glabra (Willd.) M.Gómez' – smooth smartweed
Persicaria glacialis (Meisn.) H.Hara
Persicaria glandulopilosa (De Wild.) Soják
Persicaria glomerata (Dammer) S.Ortiz & Paiva
Persicaria hastatosagittata (Makino) Nakai
Persicaria hirsuta (Walter) Small – hairy smartweed
Persicaria hispida (Kunth) M.Gómez
Persicaria humilis (Meisn.) H.Hara
Persicaria hydropiper (L.) Delarbre – water-pepper, marsh-pepper smartweed
Persicaria hydropiperoides (Michx.) Small – swamp smartweed, mild water-pepper
Persicaria hystricula (J.Schust.) Soják
Persicaria japonica (Meisn.) Nakai
Persicaria kawagoeana (Makino) Nakai
Persicaria lanigera (R.Br.) Soják
Persicaria lapathifolia (L.) Delarbre – pale persicaria
Persicaria laxmannii (Lepech.) H.Gross
Persicaria limbata (Meisn.) H.Hara
Persicaria longiseta (Bruyn) Kitag. – bristly lady's thumb
Persicaria maackiana (Regel) Nakai
Persicaria macrantha (Meisn.) Haraldson
Persicaria maculosa Gray – Jesusplant, spotted lady's thumb, redshank
Persicaria madagascariensis (Meisn.) S.Ortiz & Paiva
Persicaria malaica (Danser) Galasso
Persicaria meisneriana (Cham. & Schltdl.) M.Gómez – Mexican tearthumb
Persicaria microcephala (D.Don) H.Gross
Persicaria minor (Huds.) Opiz – small water-pepper
Persicaria mitis (Schrank) Assenov
Persicaria muricata (Meisn.) Nemoto
Persicaria neofiliformis (Nakai) Ohki
Persicaria nepalensis (Meisn.) Miyabe) – Nepal knotweed
Persicaria nogueirae S.Ortiz & Paiva
Persicaria obtusifolia (Täckh. & Boulos) Greuter & Burdet
Persicaria odorata (Lour.) Soják – Vietnamese coriander
Persicaria orientalis (L.) Spach – kiss-me-over-the-garden-gate, prince's feather, princess-feather
Persicaria palmata (Dunn) Yonek. & H.Ohashi
Persicaria paraguayensis (Wedd.) S.T.Kim & Donoghue
Persicaria peduncularis (Wall. ex Meisn.) Nemoto
Persicaria pensylvanica (L.) M.Gómez) – Pennsylvania smartweed
Persicaria perfoliata (L.) H.Gross
Persicaria poiretii (Meisn.) K.L.Wilson
Persicaria posumbu (Buch.-Ham. ex D.Don) H.Gross
Persicaria praetermissa (Hook.f.) H.Hara
Persicaria prostrata (R.Br.) Soják - Creeping Knotweed
Persicaria pubescens (Blume) H.Hara
Persicaria pulchra (Blume) Soják
Persicaria punctata (Elliott) Small – dotted knotweed
Persicaria puritanorum (Fernald) Soják
Persicaria robustior (Small) E.P.Bicknell – stout smartweed
Persicaria roseoviridis Kitag.
Persicaria rubricaulis (Cham.) Galasso
Persicaria rudis (Meisn.) H.Gross
Persicaria runcinata (Buch.-Ham. ex D.Don) H.Gross
Persicaria sagittata (L.) H.Gross – American tearthumb, arrowleaf tearthumb, arrowvine
Persicaria segetum (Kunth) Small
Persicaria senegalensis (Meisn.) Soják
Persicaria senticosa (Meisn.) H.Gross
Persicaria setacea (Baldwin) Small – bog smartweed
Persicaria setosula (A.Rich.) K.L.Wilson
Persicaria sinica Migo
Persicaria sinuata (Royle ex Bab.) H.Gross
Persicaria stagnina (Buch.-Ham. ex Meisn.) M.A.Hassan
Persicaria stelligera (Cham.) Galasso
Persicaria strigosa (R.Br.) Nakai – spotted knotweed
Persicaria subsessilis (R.Br.) K.L.Wilson
Persicaria sungareensis Kitag.
Persicaria taquetii (H.Lév.) Koidz.
Persicaria tenella (Blume) H.Hara
Persicaria thunbergii (Siebold & Zucc.) H.Gross
Persicaria tinctoria (Aiton) Spach – Chinese indigo, polygonum-indigo
Persicaria trigonocarpa (Makino) Nakai
Persicaria truellum (Koidz.) Honda
Persicaria virginiana (L.) Gaertn. – jumpseed
Persicaria viscofera (Makino) H.Gross
Persicaria viscosa (Buch.-Ham. ex D.Don) H.Gross ex T.Mori
Persicaria wellensii (De Wild.) Soják

Notes

References

Bibliography

 

 
Polygonaceae genera
Taxa named by Philip Miller